Edward Spence (9  August 1925 – 31 January 2023) was a Northern Irish Gaelic footballer. At club level he played with Belfast O'Connell's and at inter-county level with the Antrim senior football team. Spence usually lined out as a forward.

Career
Spence first played Gaelic football as a schoolboy at St Malachy's College in Belfast. His performances saw him join the Belfast O'Connell's junior team while still underage, before making his first senior appearance as an 18-year-old.

After being overlooked for the Antrim minor football team, Spence first appeared on the inter-county scene as a member of the junior team. He soon progressed to the senior team. Spence was a member of the Antrim team that won the Ulster SFC title in 1946.

Death
Spence died on 31 January 2023, at the age of 97.

Honours
Antrim
Ulster Senior Football Championship: 1946

References

1925 births
2023 deaths
Antrim inter-county Gaelic footballers